North Carolina's 4th Senate district is one of 50 districts in the North Carolina Senate. It has been represented by Democrat Toby Fitch since 2018.

Geography
Since 2019, the district has included all of Halifax, Edgecombe, and Wilson counties. The district overlaps with the 23rd, 24th, and 27th state house districts.

District officeholders since 1995

Election results

2022

2020

2018

2016

2014

2012

2010

2008

2006

2004

2002

2000

References

North Carolina Senate districts
Halifax County, North Carolina
Edgecombe County, North Carolina
Wilson County, North Carolina